In music, Op. 88 stands for Opus number 88. Compositions that are assigned this number include:

 Brahms – String Quintet No. 1
 Bruch – Concerto for Clarinet, Viola, and Orchestra
 Bruch – Concerto for Two Pianos and Orchestra
 Dvořák – Symphony No. 8
 Elgar/Payne – Symphony No. 3
 Schumann – Fantasiestücke for piano trio